Tirgaran (also Romanized as Tīrgarān; also known as Sīrgarān and Thīrgaran) is a village in Howmeh Rural District, in the Central District of Sanandaj County, Kurdistan Province, Iran. At the 2006 census, its population was 49, in 11 families. The village is populated by Kurds.

References 

Towns and villages in Sanandaj County
Kurdish settlements in Kurdistan Province